David Muñoz Bañón (born June 9, 1979, in Elche) is a former Spanish cyclist.

Major results
2002
1st stage 7 Volta a Portugal
3rd Tour de l'Avenir
3rd Trofeo Calvià
3rd Trofeo Magaluf-Palmanova
2005
2nd Vuelta a Mallorca
3rd Clásica de Almería
2006
1st stage 3 Giro del Trentino

References

1979 births
Living people
Spanish male cyclists
Sportspeople from Elche
Cyclists from the Valencian Community